Nemanja Celic (born 26 April 1999) is an Austrian professional footballer who plays as a midfielder for LASK on loan from German club Darmstadt 98.

Club career
In the summer of 2022, Celic returned to LASK on a season-long loan with an option to buy.

Personal life
Born in Austria, Celic is of Serbian descent.

References

Living people
1998 births
Austrian footballers
Association football midfielders
Austrian people of Serbian descent
Austrian Football Bundesliga players
2. Liga (Austria) players
2. Bundesliga players
FC Juniors OÖ players
LASK players
SV Darmstadt 98 players
Austrian expatriate footballers
Austrian expatriate sportspeople in Germany
Expatriate footballers in Germany